Rhinella ornata is a species of toad in the family Bufonidae that is found in Brazil and possibly Argentina. Its natural habitats are subtropical or tropical moist lowland forests, rivers, and intermittent freshwater lakes. It is threatened by habitat loss.

Rhinella ornata will mate with a sister species, Rhinella crucifer, to form the hybrid species Rhinella pombali.

References

ornatus
Amphibians described in 1824
Amphibians of Brazil
Taxonomy articles created by Polbot